{{Infobox casino
| casino=Agua Caliente
| logo=Agua Caliente Casino.jpg
| logo_size=250
| theme= Modern
| address=32-250 Bob Hope Drive Rancho Mirage, CA 92270
| image=AguaCaliente_Casino.jpg
| image_size=300
| rooms=340
| date_opened=April 6, 2001|
space_gaming=|
attractions=
| shows=The Show
| notable_restaurants= The Steakhouse, Waters Cafe, 360 Sports, Java Caliente, and The District Food Court with options ranging from pizza, to BLTs, or Beijing Beef to tacos and Mexican Torta.
| owner=Agua Caliente Band of Cahuilla Indians
| casino_type=Land-based
| renovations=2007
| names_pre=
| website= 
}}
The Agua Caliente Casino is a gambling facility, run by the Agua Caliente Band of Cahuilla Indians, in Rancho Mirage, California. The casino completed a 16-story,  hotel tower which opened on April 18, 2008. The tower is the third-tallest building in the Inland Empire.

The paved and landscaped parking lot on the property was, nearly 40 years before, a sandy patch of desert, across which Jonathan Winters drove a moving van, in the film It's a Mad, Mad, Mad, Mad World''.

The Agua Caliente Band also runs the ‘’’Spa Resort and Casino’’’ in nearby Palm Springs, California, which became Agua Caliente Casino Palm Springs in 2019.

History
On March 14, 2000, the band announced plans for the $80-million Agua Caliente Casino.

The Agua Caliente Casino opened on April 6, 2001.

See also
List of casinos in California

External links
Agua Caliente Casino
500 Nations Page
Tribal Site
Emporis Page
Casino Page

References

Casinos in Riverside County, California
Casino hotels
Native American casinos
Cahuilla
Casino
Rancho Mirage, California
Casinos completed in 2001
Hotel buildings completed in 2001
2001 establishments in California